Rohizno  is a village (selo) in Yavoriv Raion,  Lviv Oblast, in southwest Ukraine. It belongs to Yavoriv urban hromada, one of the hromadas of Ukraine. The village is at a distance of 10  kilometers from the Yavoriv. Its population is 1,529. Local government — Rohiznenska Village Council.

The first written mention of the settlement dates back to 1462. Been preserved archival records from the history of the village Rohizno of 1462, 1464, 1471, 1500, 1515 and 1589 years.
Monument of the victims of the Polish–Ottoman War (1672–76) is saved near the village Rohizno. From those times been saved Ukrainized Tatar names in the village.

References

External links 
 weather.in.ua
 Коротка історія села

Literature 
 

Villages in Yavoriv Raion